Butputter Creek is a stream in the U.S. state of Mississippi.

Butputter Creek is a name derived from the Choctaw language purported to mean "where the sumac is extensive".

References

Rivers of Mississippi
Rivers of Grenada County, Mississippi
Mississippi placenames of Native American origin